The 1993–94 USISL indoor was an American soccer season run by the United States Interregional Soccer League during the winter of 1993 to 1994.

Regular season
The 1993-1994 USISL indoor season began the first weekend of December 1993 and ended in February 1994.  Several new teams entered the league this season.  Only eleven teams had competed in the 1992-1993 indoor season.  By the fall of 1993, the Tucson Amigos, Lubbock Lazers, Arizona Cotton, San Antonio Generals and Dallas Kickers had all announced they would not play again during the 1993-1994 season.  This left only five confirmed teams for the upcoming season.  Consequently, the league brought in the Toledo Twisters, Baltimore Bays, Greensboro Dynamo, Richmond Kickers, all in the newly created Northern Division as well as the Cocoa Expos, Orlando Lions, Texas Lightning and Tulsa Roughnecks.  The Dynamo withdrew after three games and the Toledo Twisters after eight.  The Baltimore Bays, new to the indoor league, tied the Atlanta Magic, winners of the past two seasons, for the best record.  However, the Bays received top seeding for the playoffs on account of their better goal differential.

Northern Division

Southeast Division

South Central Division

Playoffs

Sizzling Four

Third place game

Final

MVP: Brian Moore

Points leaders

Honors
 Most Valuable Player: Brian Moore
 Top Goal Scorer: Virgil Stevens
 Top Goalkeeper: Yaro Dachniwsky
 Coach of the Year: Charlie Morgan
 Rookie of the Year: Ed Quick

External links
The Year in American Soccer - 1994

USISL indoor seasons
United
United